This is an episode guide for the Gerry Anderson television series Terrahawks, made for the British company LWT by Anderburr Pictures and first broadcast from 1983 to 1986 on ITV. A total of 39 episodes, listed here in their recommended broadcast order, were filmed in two production blocks at Bray Studios in Berkshire from January 1983 to August 1984, on a combined budget of £6.4 million. The 26 episodes of the first production block aired as two series from October to December 1983 and September to December 1984; the third series, comprising the final 13 episodes, from May to July 1986.

Series One (1983)
Originally, most ITV regions networked the episodes on Sunday afternoons. In November, several ITV companies moved the series to a Saturday morning timeslot. The last two episodes, "A Christmas Miracle" and "To Catch a Tiger", were broadcast across the network on Saturday mornings. TVS followed the network pattern until November, when it moved episodes to Thursdays. In some weeks, LWT were unable to broadcast episodes but made up for it by broadcasting double episodes in other weeks. Granada Television held back the series by two weeks and completed its run on 21 January 1984. Tyne Tees Television held back the series for over a month and moved the series to Thursdays, completing its run on 16 February 1984.

Series Two (1984)
Episodes were mostly networked, airing on Anglia, Border, Central, Granada, London Weekend, Tyne Tees, TSW, Yorkshire and UTV regions simultaneously on Sunday afternoons (occasionally in a different timeslot in regions such as Grampian, Scottish Television and TVS).

Series Three (1986)
The 13 episodes of the second production block were networked, airing in all ITV regions simultaneously on Saturday mornings. Before making its first appearance on British television, the whole of Series Three had already been broadcast in Japan, with eight episodes also having aired in the United States. Production codes start at 27 (skipping 26) to resolve the inconsistency in the numbering caused by the two-part pilot episode, "Expect the Unexpected", and reflect the number of distinct episodes made for the first production block.

Compilation films
From 1983 to 1984, six compilation films comprising re-edited versions of episodes from Series One were released on VHS in the UK. Each film is approximately 86 minutes in length.

Audio episodes
It was announced on 19 April 2014 that Terrahawks would be returning as a run of full-cast audio dramas featuring original cast members Denise Bryer, Jeremy Hitchen and Robbie Stevens. Anne Ridler who played Kate Kestrel and Cy-Star had died in 2011, and was replaced by Beth Chalmers, and Windsor Davies (since retired) who played Sergeant Major Zero was replaced by Jeremy Hitchen. The new audio stories were produced by Anderson Entertainment in association with Big Finish Productions. The first new series was released in April 2015, followed by a second series in April 2016 and a third in July 2017. Each series consisted of a 5-CD set, with eight episodes across four CDs and a behind-the-scenes documentary on the fifth featuring interviews with the cast and crew.

Volume 1 (2015)

Volume 2 (2016)

Volume 3 (2017)

References

External links

List of Terrahawks episodes (Series One) at Fanderson.org.uk
List of Terrahawks episodes (Series Two) at Fanderson.org.uk
"A Christmas Miracle" Episode Review in Andersonic fanzine

Lists of British action television series episodes
Lists of British children's television series episodes
Lists of British science fiction television series episodes